The Queen Mother Challenge Cup is a rowing event for men's quadruple sculls at the annual Henley Royal Regatta on the River Thames at Henley-on-Thames in England.  It is open to male crews from all eligible rowing clubs. Two or more clubs may combine to make an entry.

Winners

References

Events at Henley Royal Regatta
Rowing trophies and awards